Uncial 0247 (in the Gregory-Aland numbering), is a Greek uncial manuscript of the New Testament. Paleographically it has been assigned to the 5th or 6th century.

Description 
The codex contains a small part of the 1 Peter 5:13-14 - 2 Peter 1:5-8,14-16; 2:1, on 2 parchment leaves (29 cm by 23 cm). Written in two columns per page, 36 lines per page, in uncial letters.

It is a palimpsest, the upper text was written in Coptic, it contains a prayer.

Currently it is dated by the INTF to the 5th or 6th century.

Location 
Currently the codex is housed at the John Rylands Library (P. Copt. 20) in Manchester.

Text 
The Greek text of this codex is a representative of the Alexandrian text-type. Aland placed it in Category II.

See also  

 List of New Testament uncials 
 Textual criticism

References

Further reading  

 J. H. Greenlee, "Nine Uncial Palimpsests of the New Testament", S & D 39 (Salt Lake City, 1968). 

Greek New Testament uncials
5th-century biblical manuscripts 
Palimpsests